"Back in the U.S.S.R." is a song by the English rock band the Beatles and the first track of the 1968 double album The Beatles (also known as the "White Album"). Written by Paul McCartney and credited to the Lennon–McCartney partnership, the song is a parody of Chuck Berry's "Back in the U.S.A." and the Beach Boys' "California Girls". The lyrics subvert Berry's patriotic sentiments about the United States, as the narrator expresses relief upon returning home to the Soviet Union, formally the Union of Soviet Socialist Republics (USSR).

The Beatles recorded "Back in the U.S.S.R." as a three-piece after Ringo Starr temporarily left the group, in protest at McCartney's criticism of his drumming and the tensions that typified the sessions for the White Album. Instead, the other Beatles created a composite drum track from numerous takes. McCartney's singing was based on Jerry Lee Lewis, while the bridge features a Beach Boys–style celebration of girls from various parts of the USSR. The song opens and closes with a tape loop of an aircraft landing on a runway.

Released three months after the Warsaw Pact's invasion of Czechoslovakia, the Beatles' sympathetic portrayal of the USSR prompted condemnation in the West from both the New Left and the political right. In 1976, backed by "Twist and Shout", it was issued as a single to promote the compilation album Rock 'n' Roll Music. It peaked at number 19 on the UK Singles Chart and number 11 in Ireland. In 2003, McCartney performed the song in Moscow's Red Square. Elton John and Billy Joel have also released versions recorded during concerts in Russia.

Background and inspiration
Paul McCartney began writing the song as "I'm Backing the UK", inspired by the "I'm Backing Britain" campaign, which had gained wide national support in January 1968, a month before the Beatles departed for India to undertake a course in Transcendental Meditation. According to author Ian MacDonald, McCartney altered the title to "I'm Backing the USSR" and then, drawing on Chuck Berry's 1959 hit song "Back in the U.S.A.", arrived at the song's eventual title. Donovan, the Scottish singer-songwriter who joined the Beatles in India, said that "Back in the U.S.S.R." was one of the "funny little ditties" that McCartney regularly played at the ashram, adding that "of course, melodious ballads just poured out of him".

In a November 1968 interview for Radio Luxembourg, McCartney said the song was inspired by Berry's "Back in the U.S.A." and was written from the point of view of a Russian spy returning home to the USSR after an extended mission in the United States. Mike Love of the Beach Boys, another student at the meditation retreat, recalled McCartney playing "Back in the U.S.S.R." on acoustic guitar over breakfast in Rishikesh, at which point he suggested to McCartney that the bridge section should focus on the "girls" in Russia, in the style of the Beach Boys' "California Girls". In his 1984 interview with Playboy magazine, McCartney said he wrote it as "a kind of Beach Boys parody" based around "Back in the U.S.A." He added:
I just liked the idea of Georgia girls and talking about places like the Ukraine as if they were California, you know? It was also hands across the water, which I'm still conscious of. 'Cause they like us out there [in Soviet Russia], even though the bosses in the Kremlin may not.

In his lyrics, McCartney transposed the patriotism of Berry's song into a Soviet context. He said that he intended it to be a "spoof" on the typical American international traveller's contention that "it's just so much better back home" and their yearning for the comforts of their homeland. McCartney said that, despite the lack of such luxuries in the USSR, his Soviet traveller would "still be every bit as proud as an American would be". According to author Michael Gray, "Back in the U.S.S.R." was the Beatles' sardonic comment on Berry's idealised Americana, which had become "deeply unfashionable" by the late 1960s.

Composition
"Back in the U.S.S.R." opens and closes with the sound of a jet aircraft landing on a runway. The effect also appears partway through the recording and represents an "aural cartoon", according to music critic Tim Riley, who says the song is "offered as a hoot and delivered as such". The opening lyrics refer to a "dreadful" flight back to the USSR from Miami Beach in the United States, on board a BOAC airliner. Driven by McCartney's uptempo piano playing and Harrison's lead guitar riffs, the lyrics tell of the singer's happiness on returning home, where "the Ukraine girls really knock me out" and the "Moscow girls make me sing and shout". He invites these women to "Come and keep your comrade warm" and looks forward to hearing the sound of "balalaikas ringing out".

Cultural historian Doyle Greene describes the song as a parody of Berry's "Back in the U.S.A." "with a bridge that parodies the Beach Boys' 'California Girls'". According to Riley, while "Back in the U.S.S.R." is usually viewed as a Beach Boys parody – specifically, a "send-up" of "California Girls" and "Surfin' U.S.A." – its "more direct association" is with Berry's track. He adds that Berry's focus on commercialism is "relocated and mocked" such that "the joyous return to the Soviet homeland is sarcastic camp." McCartney's lyrics also contain an allusion to Hoagy Carmichael's and Stuart Gorrell's "Georgia on My Mind". He sings about the female population of the Soviet Republic of Georgia, right after mentioning "the Ukraine girls" and "Moscow girls".

Recording
The sessions for The Beatles (also known as the "White Album") were fraught with disharmony among the band members. While rehearsing "Back in the U.S.S.R.", on 22 August 1968, Ringo Starr became tired of McCartney's criticism of his drumming on the song, and of the bad atmosphere generally, and walked out, intent on quitting the group. The other Beatles continued with the session, which took place at EMI Studios (now Abbey Road Studios) in London. Ken Scott, the band's recording engineer, later recalled that they created a "composite drum track of bits and pieces" in Starr's absence.

Five takes were recorded of the basic track, featuring McCartney on drums, George Harrison on electric guitar, and John Lennon on Fender Bass VI. Take 5 was chosen as "best". During the overdubbing on the song, on 23 August, McCartney and Harrison also contributed bass parts, and both also added lead guitar parts. According to author John Winn, the first overdubs were piano, played by McCartney; drums by Harrison, replacing Lennon's bass part from the previous day; and another electric guitar part.

After these additions were mixed down to a single track, McCartney sang a lead vocal, using what he described as his "Jerry Lee Lewis voice", and Lennon, Harrison and McCartney added backing vocals, including Beach Boys-style harmonies over the song's bridges. All three musicians added handclaps. Other overdubs included McCartney's bass, Harrison on six-string bass, and Lennon playing a snare drum. Harrison played the guitar solo in the instrumental break, while McCartney contributed a high-pitched, single-note solo over the final verse. MacDonald describes the musical arrangement as a "thunderous wall of sound". For the sounds of the aircraft that appear on the track, a Viscount turboprop, Scott created a tape loop from a recording stored in EMI's library.

After the other Beatles urged him to return, Starr rejoined the group on 4 September to participate in the filming of a promotional clip for their "Hey Jude" single. During a break in the filming, Marc Sinden (who appears in the film) recalls Lennon playing a song on his acoustic guitar. "Everyone went 'Wow' ... Filming started before we could ask what it was. When it was later released, we realised it was Back in the USSR."

Release
Apple Records released The Beatles on 22 November 1968, with "Back in the U.S.S.R." sequenced as the opening song. The jet aircraft landing sound at the close of the track was cross-faded with the start of the next song, "Dear Prudence". In 1969, Apple issued "Back in the U.S.S.R." as a single in Scandinavia, backed by Starr's composition "Don't Pass Me By". In 1973, three years after the Beatles' break-up, the song was included on the band's double album compilation 1967–1970, as one of only three tracks representing the White Album.

On 25 June 1976, the song was issued as a single by Parlophone in the UK to promote the compilation album Rock 'n' Roll Music. The B-side was "Twist and Shout", making it the first EMI single by the Beatles to include a non-original composition. It peaked at number 19 on the UK Singles Chart, number 11 in Ireland, and number 19 in Sweden. In September 2022, the British Phonographic Industry (BPI) awarded the song a silver certification for sales and streaming figures exceeding 200,000 units. EMI made a promotional film for the release, setting the song to footage of the Beatles visiting Amsterdam in 1964 and from their 1966 tour of West Germany. The single was subsequently included in the Beatles Singles Collection box set, released by EMI's World Division in December 1982, making it the 24th single in the series.

Critical reception
In his album review for the NME, Alan Smith described the song as "A fantastic piece of screaming excitement. Great opener." Record Mirrors initial reviewer wrote: "The LP begins with a rock based, falsetto backed number called 'Back In The USSR' concerning the attributes of Russian women. Wild Harrison guitar and heavy brass lend that soul element as well." Writing for the same publication, David Griffiths described the song as a "perfectly ingenious" opening track, since:
[I]t serves the purpose of disorientating (both politically and socially) the "average" listener whose mind is likely to be thoroughly confused by such lines as "Back in the US, back in the US, back in the USSR," and the use of rock and Beach Boy effects to praise Russian chicks. With both Georgias on his mind, perhaps the listener is rendered more receptive. The message comes across that nothing is as simple as it seems and the violence of the beat effectively demonstrates that The Beatles have not gone soft, or too arty, or too far away from the basics, despite their fame and riches.

Writing in Partisan Review, Geoffrey Cannon said that The Beatles showed the band failing to engage with the contemporary rock audience in the manner that the Rolling Stones had done on their 1968 album Beggars Banquet. In Cannon's view: "The Beatles kick out the jams only in their hard rock numbers: 'Back in the U.S.S.R.', 'Birthday' and 'Helter Skelter'. But the eclecticism of the first two numbers makes them evanescent. They may intend to be good jokes about the Beach Boys, Chuck Berry and Little Richard; in fact, they hide behind these out-front stars." In his review for The New York Times, Nik Cohn similarly complained that "they hide behind send-up: the middle eight of 'Back in the U.S.S.R.,' for instance, is pure surf-age Beach Boys but it's all half-hearted and limp".

Jann Wenner of Rolling Stone described "Back in the U.S.S.R." as the "perfect example" of the Beatles' ability to quote from others' work and "expand the idiom, but... [also] to penetrate it and take it further" in a way that recent satirical albums by the Turtles and Frank Zappa had failed to do. He added: "It would be too simple to say that 'Back In the USSR' is a parody, because it operates on more levels than that: it is fine contemporary rock and roll and... also a superb commentary on the United States S. R., hitting every insight – 'honey, disconnect the phone.' As well as a parody, it's also a Beatles song." Richard Goldstein of The New York Times praised the double album's "burlesque of musical forms", saying that it represented "almost a mock-history of pop" in which "Back in the U.S.S.R." was "a rock primer, quoting the Jefferson Airplane, the Beach Boys, Jerry Lee Lewis and Ray Charles".

Tim Riley describes "Back in the U.S.S.R." as "Brian Wilson with sex appeal" and an example of how, further to "Lady Madonna", several of McCartney's 1968 compositions "straddle the ironic distance between genre treatments and fresh, inventive material that stands well on its own". In his book on the White Album, David Quantick cites the song as an example of McCartney's standing as "a master of pastiche and parody", adding that "In lesser, feebler, hands, 'Back in the U.S.S.R.' could have been a rotten comedy song, a weak parody tune, but McCartney – cocky, confident, and able to do almost anything musically – made it into something amazing." Quantick admires the three Beatles' musicianship and "hilarious" harmony vocals, and concludes: "The whole thing rocks – and rocks substantially more than the Beach Boys ever did." In a review coinciding with the album's 40th anniversary, John Bohannon of PopMatters similarly praised the band's performance, including the guitar work and a McCartney vocal that he deemed "one of the best hard rock vocal[s] delivered from below the belt".

In 2010, Rolling Stone ranked "Back in the U.S.S.R." at number 85 on the magazine's list of the "100 Greatest Beatles Songs". In a similar list compiled by Mojo in 2006, it appeared at number 64. In his commentary for the magazine, English singer Billy Bragg said that 1968 was when "our love affair with all things American began to turn sour", with the year marked by reports of US atrocities in Vietnam, the assassinations of Martin Luther King and Robert Kennedy, the gesture of African-American athletes introducing Black Power politics at the Mexico Olympic Games, and Richard Nixon's victory in the US presidential race. Bragg added: "By opening [the White Album] with this wonderful inversion of Chuck Berry's Back In The USA, The Beatles made clear whose side they were on... Subversive or just mischievous? You decide." In 2018, the music staff of Time Out London ranked the song at number 26 on their list of the best Beatles songs.

Political controversy and cultural significance
Like "Revolution" and "Piggies", "Back in the U.S.S.R." prompted immediate responses in the US from the New Left and the Right. Among the latter, the John Birch Society's magazine cited the song as further evidence of the Beatles' supposed pro-Soviet sentiments. The line "You don't know how lucky you are, boys" left many anti-communist groups stunned. In Riley's view, the song's mocking tone and communist setting thereby had "the desired effect of inciting the [ire]" of the John Birch Society, who misunderstood the lyrics' "sympathetic socialism".

Ian MacDonald described the song as "a rather tactless jest", given that the Soviet Army had recently invaded what was then called Czechoslovakia and thwarted that country's attempt to introduce democratic reforms. Some members of the New Left also criticised the Beatles for this gesture. During the 1960s, the Beatles were officially derided in the Soviet Union as the "belch of Western culture". David Noebel, a longstanding critic of the Beatles' influence on Western youth, said that: "The lyrics have left even the Reds speechless."

Writing for the website Russia Beyond, Tommy O'Callaghan describes "Back in the U.S.S.R." as a "parody that became a peace offering". He says that, just as the Beatles provided a source of unity with the West for contemporary Russian music fans, the band set out to mock the "new Western narrative" presented by both McCarthyism and the New Left. Aside from the send-ups of the Beach Boys, Berry's "flag-waving" song and Prime Minister Harold Wilson's 'I'm Backing Britain' campaign, O'Callaghan views the references to Russian girls as mocking the "perceived unsexiness" of Soviet culture and says that the song's true satirical qualities are in "its portrayal of Russians and Americans at parity".

Although the Beatles were never allowed to perform in the USSR, Elton John was permitted to visit the country in 1979 in a historic concert tour, which Billboard magazine referred to as the first there by an "out-and-out rock artist". He sang "Back in the U.S.S.R." as his closing song throughout the tour, ignoring an official request after his opening show that he not do so. Video from these concerts appeared in the documentary film To Russia with Elton.

In the 1980s McCartney was refused permission to perform in the USSR. In Barry Miles' 1997 book Paul McCartney: Many Years from Now, McCartney said that: "Probably my single most important reason for going to Russia would be to play ['Back in the U.S.S.R.']" According to The Moscow Times, when McCartney finally got to play the song on his Back in the World tour in Moscow's Red Square in May 2003, "the crowd went wild". When asked about the song before the concert, McCartney said he had known little about the Soviet Union when he wrote it and added: "It was a mystical land then. It's nice to see the reality. I always suspected that people had big hearts. Now I know that's true." In his autobiography, Good Vibrations, Mike Love writes: "'Back in the U.S.S.R.' was a helluva song, and it's lasted longer than the country."

In 1987, Billy Joel covered the song on his live-in-the-Soviet Union album Kontsert. Also released as a single, his version reached number 33 in Australia and number 44 in New Zealand. McCartney said in 1997 that Joel's adoption of "Back in the U.S.S.R." for his Russian concert tours had contributed to the "jokey" song's standing as "a bit of an anthem now".

On 4 July 1984, the Beach Boys played "Back in the U.S.S.R.", with Starr joining them as a special guest, during their Fourth of July concerts in Washington, DC, and Miami. In Love's recollection, the "irony" of an Englishman being part of the celebrations for America's independence from Britain "was not lost on Ringo". Starr told a reporter: "Happy Birthday [America]... Sorry we lost."

Personnel
According to Ian MacDonald and Mark Lewisohn:

Paul McCartney – double-tracked vocal, backing vocal, piano, bass guitar, drums, lead guitar, handclaps, percussion
John Lennon – backing vocal, rhythm guitar, six-string bass, handclaps, drums, percussion
George Harrison – backing vocal, rhythm and lead guitars, bass, drums, handclaps, percussion

Certifications

Notes

References

Sources

External links

 Full lyrics for the song at the Beatles' official website
 
 

1968 songs
The Beatles songs
Songs written by Lennon–McCartney
Song recordings produced by George Martin
Songs published by Northern Songs
Apple Records singles
Parlophone singles
1969 singles
1976 singles
1987 singles
Billy Joel songs
Chubby Checker songs
Jan and Dean songs
Dead Kennedys songs
Live singles
Songs about Russia
Answer songs
Musical parodies
Musical tributes to the Beach Boys
British rock-and-roll songs